The 2016–17 season was Bolton Wanderers's first season in the third tier of English football since 1993 following their relegation from the Football League Championship. Along with Football League One, the club competed in the FA Cup,  Football League Cup and Football League Trophy. The season covered the period from 1 July 2016 to 30 June 2017.

Pre-season

On 20 May 2016, Bolton Wanderers announced their English pre-season schedule in full for both the entire squad and an XI squad. They also announced that there would be a training camp and further games abroad. These games were confirmed on 3 June as being against Danish teams HB Køge and FC Helsingør. On 17 June the away game at Ashton United was cancelled as the home side's pitch would not be ready. On 27 June the game at HB Køge was cancelled as it was felt that the date was too early in the pre-season. The Bolton XI game against Chester on 20 July was also cancelled as it was felt there was not enough first-team players to make up Bolton's team travelling to Tranmere Rovers a day earlier. Due to this, some of the Bolton XI traveled with the first-team for the game and both games were mixtures of first team players and the reserve players.

Competitions

League One

League table

Matches
On 22 June 2016, the fixtures for the forthcoming season were announced. Bolton will start the season at home to Sheffield United on 6 August and finish at home to Peterborough United on April 30, 2017.

FA Cup

Bolton entered the competition at the first round stage for the first time since 1993, alongside all other Football League One and Football League Two sides.

League Cup

Bolton entered the competition at the first round stage and were drawn to play away at Blackpool in the first round.

EFL Trophy

Bolton entered the competition at the first round group stage and were drawn against Everton U-23, Blackpool and Cheltenham Town in Northern Group A.

Squad

Statistics

|-
|colspan=14|Out on Loan:

|-
|colspan=14|Player who left the club during the course of the season:

|}

Goals record

Disciplinary record

Transfers
At the completion of the previous season the club announced that twenty players would not be offered new contracts once their present ones concluded. These players included senior squad members Neil Danns, Stephen Dobbie, Tom Eaves, Liam Feeney, Robert Hall, Emile Heskey, Paul Rachubka, Oscar Threlkeld, David Wheater and Hayden White. These players were followed out of the club by young defender Tyler Garratt who signed for Doncaster Rovers on 28 June for an undisclosed fee.

On 1 July, it was reported that the transfer embargo that the club had been under since the previous season was to be at least partially lifted by the Football League and the day after former Blackburn Rovers midfielder Chris Taylor signed on a free transfer, followed the following day by Millwall defender Mark Beevers, also on a free transfer. They were followed on 5 July by Bradford City forward Jamie Proctor, also signed on a free transfer. Former Sheffield United goalkeeper Mark Howard then signed for the club. David Wheater re-signed on a one-year deal after initially being released at the end of the previous season. He was shortly followed to the club by defender Lewis Buxton after his release from Rotherham United.

Transfers in

Transfers out

Loans in

Loans out

Summary

References

Bolton Wanderers F.C. seasons
Bolton Wanderers